Judson Earney Scott (born July 15, 1952) is an American stage, film and television actor. He has appeared in a number of science fiction productions, especially within the Star Trek franchise, as well as V and three episodes of The X-Files.

Early years
Scott was born in Azusa, California and attended Carl Sandberg Jr. High and Glendora High Schools. He then went to California State University, Fullerton, received a B.A. in Theatre Arts, and trained at the Actors Studio in Los Angeles. At the end of the school year in college, Scott entered the American College Theater Festival and won the Irene Ryan Award for Best Actor in the Western United States. Scott was then offered a scholarship to Yale School of Drama, but instead attended the Juilliard School in New York City, where he again graduated with a B.A. in Theater Arts.

Career
In 1973, Scott starred with Al Pacino on Broadway in Shakespeare's Richard III. His first film role was in Every Which Way But Loose (1978), in which he played a biker. His other films include I, the Jury (1982) and Escape (1990).

Scott starred in the short-lived 1982 science fiction television series The Phoenix. His other television roles include Lt. James in seven episodes of V, and as Sacha Malenkov on The Colbys. He also portrayed Peter Harrell on General Hospital in 1984–85.

Other guest appearances include  Mission: Impossible (as Ernst Graff in "The Legacy") Voyagers!, The Dukes of Hazzard, The A-Team, Babylon 5 (as "Knight One" in "And the Sky Full of Stars", 1994), Charmed (as "Necron" in episodes "A Witches Tale" 1 & 2), The Adventures of Brisco County Jr. (Episode: No Man's Land.  As outlaw brother Gill Swill), The X-Files and The Greatest American Hero (as Dak Hampton in the episode "Rock 'n' Roll"). He also made three appearances on Matt Houston as a Navajo shaman turned assassin.

Star Trek roles
In the 1982 film Star Trek II: The Wrath of Khan, Scott played Joachim, chief lieutenant of Khan Noonien Singh. Despite having many lines of dialogue, Scott's name does not appear in the credits. According to TV Guide, Scott's agent was in negotiations with Paramount to get his name high billing in the movie, but the tactic backfired and somehow Scott wound up with no credit at all.  He played opposite Ricardo Montalbán, which resulted in a friendship that lasted until Montalbán's death in January 2009. When Montalbán received a lifetime achievement award in 2003, Scott was the presenter.

Scott's next role in the Star Trek franchise was Sobi, a central character in "Symbiosis", a first-season episode of Star Trek: The Next Generation.  In this episode Scott played opposite Merritt Butrick, who played Admiral Kirk's son in Star Trek II.

Scott also played a Romulan in the fourth-season Star Trek: Voyager episode "Message in a Bottle".

Scott still makes appearances at science fiction conventions and has his own fan club composed mostly of Star Trek fans.

Filmography
Every Which Way but Loose (1978) - Black Widow Biker (uncredited)
The Phoenix (1982 TV series) (1980 - TV pilot, 1982 - TV series) - Bennu
I, the Jury (1982) - Charles Kendricks
Star Trek II: The Wrath of Khan (1982) - Joachim (uncredited)
The Dukes of Hazzard (1979–1985) - Lee Benson
The Greatest American Hero (1983) - Dak Hampton, lead singer of a rock group called Elvira
"V: The Series" (1984) - Lieutenant James
Mission : impossible (TV Series) Episode : The Legacy (1988) - Ernst Graff
"Star Trek: The Next Generation (TV Series) Episode: Symbiosis (1988) - Sobi
Escape (1989) - Gabriel LaFontaine
True Identity (1991) - Iago
Walker, Texas Ranger (1993-2001) - Travis Braxton
Blade (1998) - Pallantine
Babylon 5 (TV Series) Episode: And The Sky Full Of Stars (1994) - Knight One

References

External links
 
 

1952 births
American male film actors
American male stage actors
American male television actors
Juilliard School alumni
Living people
People from Azusa, California
California State University, Fullerton alumni